Torp may refer to:


People
 Torp (surname), a list of people

Places
 Torp, Iran, a village in East Azerbaijan Province
 Torp Court District, an administrative region of Sweden
 Torp, a place in the Norwegian municipality Fredrikstad, Viken county, Norway 
 Torp, a place in the Norwegian municipality Sandefjord, Vestfold og Telemark county, Norway
 Torp, a village in the Swedish municipality Borgholm, Sweden
 Torp or Torps, a hamlet in Villers-Canivet, Normandy, France
 Torp, a former French commune, now part of the commune Le Torp-Mesnil, Normandy, France

Other uses
 Torp (architecture), a small rural dwelling and agricultural unit in Scandinavia, similar to a croft
 Sandefjord Airport, Torp, shortened to Torp, Sandefjord, Norway
 Torp Station, a railway station near Sandefjord Airport 
 Total ossicular replacement prosthesis (TORP), an inner-ear prosthesis
 Farman F.60 Torp, a French biplane airliner and bomber introduced in 1919

See also
 Torpe (disambiguation)
 Torpes (disambiguation)
 Le Torpt